Matthew Whinn (1612-1683) was the sixth recorded Registrary of the University of Cambridge.

Mere was born in Cambridge. He entered St John's College, Cambridge in 1630. He graduated B.A. in 1634 and M.A. in 1637.  He also became the university printer in 1669.

References

1683 deaths
1612 births
Alumni of St John's College, Cambridge
Registraries of the University of Cambridge
People from Cambridge